This was the first edition of the tournament.

Enzo Couacaud won the title after defeating Ugo Humbert 6–2, 6–3 in the final.

Seeds

Draw

Finals

Top half

Bottom half

References
Main Draw
Qualifying Draw

Cassis Open Provence - Singles